The Organization for the Defense of Four Freedoms for Ukraine (ODFFU) was formed on October 27, 1946 at a conference of representatives from various Ukrainian American organizations in New York City. Founding member and first president, Mr. Yevhen Liakhovych, an engineer by training and a proponent of the Ukrainian nation's right to self-determination and independence from the Soviet Union, established the ODFFU to support the struggle for a free and independent Ukraine.

Early History

Throughout the years of its existence, ODFFU grew from a small group of dedicated individuals with one branch in Newark, New Jersey, to a large national organization with over 57 branches located in the most populated Ukrainian-American areas of the US.

In 1990, Ukraine declared its sovereignty, and in 1991, Ukraine declared its independence. At this point, Ukraine was free, but not quite democratic. In 2004, with the "Orange Revolution,” Ukraine made larger steps toward true democracy. The ODFFU today continues its work to make sure the four freedoms are a part of this new Ukraine.

Ideology of the ODFFU

The name and the ideology of the “Organization for the Defense of Four Freedoms for Ukraine” is based upon President Franklin D. Roosevelt's Four Freedoms Address before the US Congress on January 25, 1941. This speech formed the basis of a strategic partnership between the United States and Great Britain that became embodied in a declaration known as the Atlantic Charter. Following an extensive remodelling at the National Archives, President Roosevelt's speech sits alongside America's founding documents like the Declaration of Independence, and the Constitution.

The four freedoms are:

1) Freedom of Speech. This idea represents not only the rights of individuals, but also the rights of a free nation to freely formulate its ideas and development.

2) Freedom of Conscience. This cannot exist while one is under any type of physical occupation. Freedom of Conscience only exists when one embodies a belief in God and freedom of religion.

3) Freedom from Fear. Individuals must have the right to freely develop their political, social, cultural and economic institutions, which they feel will benefit their nation.

4) Freedom from Want. This can only be achieved by having a government that provides opportunities for people to have access to the means of development and growth economically.

External links
Official Website

Ukrainian-American culture in New York City
Ukrainian-American history
Organizations established in 1946